Barbarin is a surname. Notable people with the surname include:

Paul Jean Joseph Barbarin (1855–1931), French mathematician
Philippe Barbarin, Archbishop emeritus of Lyon, France, and Cardinal of the Catholic Church 
Members of the musical Barbarin family
Isidore Barbarin (1871–1960), New Orleans jazz cornet and alto horn player and bandleader, father of Paul and Louis, grandfather of Danny Barker, great-grandfather of Lucien
Lucien Barbarin (1956–2020), New Orleans trombone player
Paul Barbarin (1899–1969), New Orleans jazz drummer
Louis Barbarin (1902–1997), New Orleans jazz drummer